Sacha Labillois-Kennedy  is a Chief of the Eel River Bar First Nation in New Brunswick, Canada. She first served as a councillor for two years, before being elected Chief in June 2019.

She served as the First Nation's economic development officer since February 2008, earning her a nomination for “Economic development officer of the year” in 2017 by Cando, national Indigenous organization involved in community economic development.

Labillois-Kennedy is fluent in both English and French.

Her grandmother is Margaret Labillois, the first woman in New Brunswick to be named a chief of a first nations community in 1970.

References

Indigenous leaders in Atlantic Canada
Year of birth missing (living people)
Living people